The Women's Equality Party (WEP) is a feminist political party set up in the United Kingdom in 2015. The idea was conceived by Catherine Mayer and Sandi Toksvig at the Women of the World Festival, when they concluded that there was a need for a party to campaign for gender equality to the benefit of all. The launch meeting was on 28 March 2015 under the title "The Women's Equality Party needs you. But probably not as much as you need the Women's Equality Party". The party's full policy was launched by its then-leader Sophie Walker at Conway Hall on 20 October 2015. In January 2020, Mandu Reid took over as party leader.

History

On 2 March 2015, author and journalist Catherine Mayer attended a "Women in Politics" event at the Women of the World Festival (at the Southbank Centre in central London). The panel was chaired by Jude Kelly (Artistic Director, Southbank Centre), and the panel consisted of Katie Ghose (CEO, Electoral Reform Society), Margot James (Conservative), Stella Creasy (Labour) and Jo Swinson (Lib Dem). Having watched the panelists agreeing collegially with each other on almost every point, Mayer stood up and said, "What about if I found a Women's Equality Party, tell you what, I'm going to go to the bar afterwards, anyone interested in discussing this come and see me."

On 8 March 2015 (International Women's Day), at the same festival, comedian Sandi Toksvig presented an event entitled "Sandi Toksvig's Mirth Control: Stand Up and Be Counted". Interviewed by Jenni Murray on BBC Radio 4's Woman's Hour, Toksvig said: "I had a fantasy cabinet of women, and I didn't care which party they came from, we had Doreen Lawrence as our Home Secretary. Can you imagine anything more wonderful? We had paralympian Tanni Grey-Thompson as our Sports Minister, and I asked them to put forward practical suggestions. The world is in a parlous state, 9.1 million women failed to vote in the last election, we need to attract them, we also need to attract the more than 7 million men who didn't vote. Why are people not engaged in politics, because I don't think that the people standing represent the diversity of this country." Mayer phoned Toksvig, and the two agreed to become co-founders of the party.

The first meeting of the as yet unnamed party was on 28 March 2015. Speakers included: Suzanne Moore, who had previously stood for parliament as an independent candidate; Sophie Walker, who spoke on careers, parenting and ensuring that both parents have opportunities in both; Halla Gunnarsdóttir, who described a women's equality party in Iceland; and Hannah McGrath, who discussed the practicalities of starting a party. The meeting was covered on Woman's Hour and by the press, including Glamour magazine and the London Evening Standard.

A second meeting took place at Conway Hall on 18 April, and included Sandi Toksvig, Mandy Colleran, Nimko Ali, Shabnam Shabazi and Stella Duffy as speakers.

On 30 April, Toksvig announced that she was leaving her position as compère of Radio 4's The News Quiz in order to help set up the new political party, which was now named the Women's Equality Party. Speaking at the Hay Festival in May, Toksvig reported that since she had announced the move on BBC One's The One Show, she had been subjected to a significant level of abuse online.

The Women's Equality Party was registered with the Electoral Commission on 20 July 2015. On 22 July, Reuters journalist Sophie Walker was announced as the party's first leader. Walker went on to stand in Shipley at the 2017 general election, but lost to Conservative Party MP and men's rights activist Philip Davies.

Leadership contest 2018
The party announced its first leadership contest in December 2017. Nominations opened on 5 January 2018, and closed on 24 January. Two candidates were nominated: interim leader Sophie Walker and Magda Devas, who had previously run for the Green Party in the Streatham Wells ward in the Lambeth London Borough Council election of 2010 and that of 2014. The ballot opened on 14 February 2018, and closed on 6 March; Walker was declared the winner on 8 March.

Walker had been due to serve a five-year term until 2023 but resigned 10 months later, stating "sometimes in order to lead, you have to get out of the way". She was replaced by interim leader Mandu Reid, the party's national spokesperson on equal parenting and caregiving, its candidate in the 2018 Lewisham East by-election, and the CEO of period poverty charity The Cup Effect.

Political aims
The party's mission statement opens with: "Equality for women isn't a women's issue. When women fulfil their potential, everyone benefits. Equality means better politics, a more vibrant economy, a workforce that draws on the talents of the whole population and a society at ease with itself".

Describing the six aims, Mayer said: "It's a very narrow palette, we're not looking to be a party that can answer questions about what should be done in the Ukraine, or trying to have a platform on the environment or anything else, we are focusing absolutely narrowly on that equality agenda." Party leader Walker agreed: "We won't have policies on other issues. We are going to concentrate, laser-like, on all of the above, to make them happen. And we will welcome people from any other political party that agrees with our values of diversity and inclusivity to work with us." However, Walker promised that the party's working definition of the word "woman", as well as more detail of the party's policies, would be covered in its policy launch, following consultation with party members.

Early indications of what to expect included Walker's call for a gender quota system to select MPs at the following two elections so that equal representation could be achieved in the House of Commons by 2025. Walker also called for six weeks' paid leave, at 90% pay, for both parents after having a baby, as well as an extra 10 months of shared leave at statutory pay. Writing in the Daily Mirror, Toksvig stated that the party further proposed that industrial tribunal costs be reduced from over £1,000 to "£50 for those who can afford it" in order to "empower all women to speak out about sexism at work."

The party launched its full set of policies on 20 October 2015 at Conway Hall.

First party conference
The inaugural Women's Equality Party conference took place in Manchester on 25–27 November 2016, with opening speeches by founders Catherine Mayer and Sandi Toksvig on the first day, and Sophie Walker's leader's speech on the second day.

Motions carried at the conference include: a motion to expand the UK's definition of hate crime to include misogyny; a motion to strengthen the legislation for carers who need flexible working arrangements; and a motion to fully decriminalise abortion across the UK (the current Abortion Act excludes Northern Ireland).

Other speakers at the Conference included CEO of the Young Women’s Trust Carole Easton, psychologist Carolyn Kagan, former President of the National Union of Students Shakira Martin, sexual harassment lawyer Dr. Ann Olivarius, and Swedish politician Gudrun Schyman.

Additional party goal 
A seventh goal of the party was added to the existing six at the party's first conference.

Second party conference
The second party conference took place in Kettering in September 2018. Among the motions passed was one supporting the People's Vote campaign calling for a public vote on the final Brexit deal between the United Kingdom and the European Union.

The party's name
The party's name was "debated and discussed at two public meetings". When Toksvig was asked why the party was named the Women's Equality Party, rather than just the Equality Party, she answered: "Because there is a huge issue, women are certainly not equal.... It's time that women, finally, after all these years, what is it, almost a hundred years since we finally got the vote, it's time we stepped up and took our equal place in society." She also stated the party's motto, "Equality is better for everybody". Mayer has also stated, "I'm very happy with the name: all genders are joining us and I hope they continue to. More than half the population is living in inequality and that is genuinely not good for everyone, economically or culturally."

Elections

2015
The party did not field any candidates in the 2015 general election, but planned to do so when the next election was assumed to be in 2020. Walker told BBC Radio Wales' Sunday Supplement programme that the party would be taking a non-partisan approach to elections, stating that "We will be undertaking consultations with our members and deciding which seats to target". Figures from the party suggested that there was a possibility that an existing Member of Parliament (MP) might defect to the party before the party contested an election, citing the example of how the UK Independence Party got its first MPs. although this did not happen. Initially Walker neither ruled in or out the possibility of a WEP candidate in the 2016 London mayoral election: "We'd like to. It's a £20,000 losable deposit, though. If you're Zac Goldsmith that's not such a big deal but if a woman from a normal background wants to speak out for women and do it with the mayorship, automatically she's almost excluded". However, in October 2015, the party announced its intention to field candidates in the 2016 London Assembly election.

2016
Following various fundraisers, the party was able to field candidates in the 2016 London elections (Walker in the Mayoral election, plus candidates for the London Assembly); Scottish Parliament election, Glasgow region (Anne Beetham, Susan Mackay, Ruth Wilkinson, Calum Shepherd, Penelope Haddrill, Carol Young) and Lothian region (Lee Chalmers, Jennifer Royston, Catriona MacDonald and Abigail Herrmann); and the Welsh Assembly election in South Wales Central (Sharon Lovell, Emma Rose, Sarah Rees and Ruth Williams).

Supporters of the WEP's election bid included: Emma Thompson, Lily Allen, Hugh Quarshie, Tanya Moodie, Philippa Perry, Jack Monroe, Jo Brand, Rosie Boycott and Caitlin Moran.

The WEP did not win any seats in the elections: Walker gained 53,055 votes (2.04%) in the first round of voting for London mayor. The party's best result was on the London-wide list where it finished sixth with 91,772 votes (3.5%).

Anne Beetham gained 2,091 votes (0.8%) in Glasgow and Lee Chalmers gained 3,877 votes (1.2%) in Lothian. Overall the WEP obtained 5,968 votes, 0.3% of the Scottish vote.

Sharon Lovell, Emma Rose, Sarah Rees and Ruth Williams gained 2,807 votes, 1.2% of the total vote in South Wales Central.

The overall total number of votes cast for the party in Scotland, Wales and London was 350,000.

2017
Tabitha Morton from Netherton stood in the Liverpool City Region mayoral election. She came seventh, receiving 4,287 first round votes (1.5%).

In the 2017 general election the party stood seven candidates. None were elected, and all lost their deposits. The best result among them was by Sophie Walker coming fourth in Shipley against the sitting Conservative MP Philip Davies, a men's rights and anti-political correctness campaigner. The party targeted Davies's seat because of his role in blocking legislation that would have implemented better support for domestic violence victims, and because of his public comments about women, people with disabilities and LGBT people. Academics Emily Harmer and Rosalynd Southern write that: "Targeting Davies was controversial due to fears over potential vote-splitting and the fact that the WEP failed to engage with local feminist groups". The full list of WEP candidates in the 2017 general election is below:

2018
The party put up candidates in more than 30 elections in the local elections of 2018. None were elected.

Mandu Reid stood as a candidate for the WEP in the 2018 Lewisham East by-election; she came fifth out of the 14 candidates, receiving 506 votes (2.3%).

2019

General election
The party put forward three candidates at the 2019 general election, all of whom lost their deposits, due to winning a low number of votes.

These constituencies have previously had an MP suspended from his respective party because of allegations of sexual assault or harassment, although all three MPs that had been accused will not be seeking re-election. Two prospective WEP candidates in Sheffield Hallam and the Cities of London and Westminster stood aside to support the Liberal Democrats after they agreed to implement a WEP policy to challenge two MPs, one accused of writing sexist messages online and the other of grabbing and manhandling a female environmental protester.

Local elections
The party put up candidates in more than 20 of the local elections of 2019. The party saw its first councillor, Kay Wesley, elected.  Wesley was standing as the sole Women's Equality Party candidate and received 1250 votes (a 5.7% share of the vote) to represent the East Ward on Congleton Town Council.

2020
In January 2020, Mandu Reid was announced as the party leader following her role as interim leader since early 2019.

2021
Reid was the party's candidate for the 2021 London mayoral election on 6 May 2021, having replaced Sue Black, who had to withdraw for health reasons. Reid finished tenth in the mayoral election with 21,182 votes (0.8%). The party also stood on the London-wide list in the 2021 London Assembly election, coming fifth with 55,684 votes (2.2%), a fall compared to their previous result.

It also stood 3 candidates in the Lothian region (coming tenth with 0.3%, down 0.9% from the previous election) and 4 candidates in the Glasgow region (coming tenth with 0.3%, down 0.5% from the previous election) for the 2021 Scottish Parliament election.

2022
The party stood 2 candidates in the 2022 City of London Corporation election, both of whom came last in their wards. Harini Iyengar received an 11.1% share of the vote in the ward of Bread Street out of 4 candidates, while Alison Smith received a 3.2% share of the vote in the ward of Portsoken out of 7 candidates.

Membership and local organisations
Reportedly, 1,300 people joined the party on the day that it opened up membership, which costs £4 per month. In the first financial year, the party raised £512,219 in membership fees. , 65 local and regional Women's Equality Party groups had been founded, and in July 2016 the party reported that it had 65,000 members. The WEP was described as "the fastest growing political force in the UK" in a Daily Telegraph article on the party's campaigning for the May 2016 London mayoral election. The party's membership reportedly grew from 25,000 to 55,000 in the month following the European Union membership referendum. In September 2020, it was reported that the party's membership was 30,000.

Fundraising and donations
The party's first fundraiser, held in front of 400 people, including businesswoman Martha Lane Fox, took place at Conway Hall on 9 June 2015. In September that year Toksvig announced the dates for a comedy tour to raise funds for the party. In the party's first year (ending 31 December 2015) £512,219 was raised through membership fees, £38,528 through fundraising activities and £79,212 was raised through donations.

The artist Damien Hirst created a piece of work for auction entitled "Spin Drawing for Women's Equality" (2015). The piece, which contained the party's colours, raised £20,000 when it was auctioned in April 2016. The artists Jake and Dinos Chapman also began a campaign, stamping the words "Womens Equality Party" onto 2p coins and then returning them into circulation. (Suffragettes had also defaced pennies.)

In the party's second year (ending 31 December 2016) £447,946 was raised through membership fees, £35,918 through fundraising activities and £261,394 was raised through donations.

Criticism
A year before the creation of the WEP, Suzanne Moore suggested in The Guardian that a feminist party should be formed, saying: "the false doctrine of austerity has meant that women, single mothers in particular, and public sector workers in general, have been at the frontline of this war. They have been demonised and subject to punitive cuts." Writing in The Telegraph, Kate Maltby responded by saying, "My feminism is directly tied to a commitment to meritocracy and individual flourishing...if her [Moore's] grand new feminist party kicks off by nationalising private property, I'm hardly going to be able to sign up".

The British edition of GQ has also accused the party of "alienating 50 per cent of the electorate", adding that, "while the WEP may aim to appeal to both female Tory voters and female Labour voters, it doesn't take away from the implicit suggestion that the party – which aims for 'diverse' membership – is still aimed almost solely at women". The party has also been criticised "for being  white, middle-class affluent women".

The International Union of Sex Workers have criticised the party stance on the criminalisation of commercial sex.

The party has also been accused of being "both too ambitious and not ambitious enough", that, in order to maintain traction, it ought to concentrate on just one issue, e.g., quotas in the boardroom.

Heather Brunskell-Evans, a research fellow at King's College London, was a spokeswoman for the party on violence against women, and described by the party as "a tireless campaigner". Speaking on the Moral Maze, she argued that transgender adults should be free to define themselves as they wish, but questioned whether positive affirmation was the only way to help children expressing confusion about gender. "What actually happens is that a small child is told there is something not quite right with its body, and it’s got the brain of another gender. I think we’re imposing… I think it’s abusive, actually. We’re imposing restrictions on children," she said. Subsequently, she withdrew from a King's event after protests by students, and three transgender members complained to the party that she was "promoting prejudice against the transgender community". Brunskell-Evans was investigated by the party and subsequently resigned.

Electoral performance

General elections

London Mayoral elections

London Assembly elections

National Assembly for Wales elections

Scottish Parliament elections

See also 
 Feminism in the United Kingdom

References

Notes

 Janet Baker, Brixton Hill ward, Lambeth · Ann Butler, Walkley ward, Sheffield · Diane Coffey, Heatons North ward, Stockport · Cat Crossley, Baildon ward, Bradford · Claire Empson, Goose Green ward, Southwark · Leila Fazal, Ferndale ward, Lambeth · Bea Gare, Duryard & St James ward, Exeter · Tulip Hambleton, Town ward, Enfield · Jo Heathcote, Chorlton ward, Manchester · Eleanor Hemmens, Prince's ward, Lambeth · Harini Iyengar, Mayor of Hackney (and also Dalston ward, Hackney) · Louise Jennings, Headingley and Hyde Park ward, Leeds · Sam Johnson, Deansgate ward, Manchester · Emma Ko, Queens Park ward, Brent · Jean Laight, St. Georges ward, Harrogate · Jessie Macneil-Brown, Bethnal Green ward, Tower Hamlets · Alison Marshall, Highbury West ward, Islington · Caroline MacVay, Plaistow and Sundridge ward, Bromley · Rebecca Manson Jones, Ladywell ward, Lewisham · Liz Orr, Culverden ward, Tunbridge Wells · Caroline Rayfield, Twickenham Riverside ward, Richmond · Mandu Reid, Lewisham Central ward, Lewisham · Pamela Richie, Charlton ward, Greenwich · Eileen Scholes, Borough & Bankside ward, Southwark · Helen Shay, Stray ward, Harrogate · Amanda Shribman, West Finchley ward, Barnet · Leisa Taylor, Bedwardine ward, Worcester · Wendy Thomson, Peppard ward, Reading · Nikki Uppal, Hillrise ward, Islington · Kate Vang, Brockley ward, Lewisham

 Nicke Adebowale, Evelyn ward (by-election), Lewisham · Hannah Barham-Brown, Roundhay ward, Leeds · Beverly Barstow, Hanover and Elm Grove ward, Brighton and Hove · Vinice Bridget Cowell, Chalkwell ward, Southend-on-Sea · Priya Brown, Eastrop ward, Basingstoke and Deane · Jen Bryan, Heatons North ward, Stockport · Samantha Days, Crumpsall ward, Manchester · Sally Duffin, Heworth ward, York · Bea Gare, Duryard & St. James ward, Exeter · Amy Gooding, Walkley ward, Sheffield · Cairis Grant-Hickey, Whitefoot ward (by-election), Lewisham · Jo Heathcote, Chorlton ward, Manchester · Caroline Hunt, Headingley & Hyde Park ward, Leeds · Louise Jennings, Alwoodley ward, Leeds · Sam Johnson, Deansgate ward, Manchester · Jessie MacNeil-Brown, Central Hove ward, Brighton and Hove · Liz Orr, Culverden ward, Tunbridge Wells · Sarika Paul, Didsbury West ward, Manchester · Erika Raffle-Currie, Childwall ward, Liverpool · Kanndiss Riley, Cliftonville East ward, Thanet · Megan Senior, Ecclesall ward, Sheffield · Leisa Taylor, Bedwardine ward, Worcester · Celine Thomas, Pantiles & St Mark's ward, Tunbridge Wells · Louise Timlin, Evendons ward, Wokingham · Kay Wesley, Congleton East ward, Cheshire East (and Kay Wesley, Congleton Town Council) · Jane Whild, Campbell Park & Old Woughton ward, Milton Keynes · Annie Wood, Eccles ward, Salford

Further reading

External links

2015 establishments in the United Kingdom
Political parties established in 2015
Feminist parties in the United Kingdom